Buck Meadows (formerly Hamilton's and Hamilton's Station) is a census-designated place in Mariposa County, California, United States. The population was 21 at the 2020 census.

Buck Meadows lies just south of the Tuolumne County line. The ZIP Code for this community is shared with Groveland (95321), and wired telephones work out of Groveland's telephone exchange with numbers following the format (209) 962-xxxx.

The area is named for Buck's Meadow  which lies at the corner of SR120 and Smith Station Road. According to The Big Oak Flat Road, a variant name for the area was Hamilton's Station. This may have referred to the name of a stagecoach stop.

 east of U.S.F.S. Buck Meadows Fire Station, "Rim of the World" overlooks the canyon containing the South Fork of the Tuolumne River.

Further east, visitors on hot summer days can cool off at a Stanislaus National Forest picnic area called "Rainbow Pool". The area is on the south side of SR120 2.25 miles east of U.S.F.S. Buck Meadows Fire Station.

This community is home to Lucky Buck Restaurant on SR120. Southwest of town, the U.S. Forest Service, Stanislaus National Forest fire lookout at Smith Peak overlooks the area. A U.S.F.S. campground and fire station are also present in the community.

History
Buck Meadows started as a stage stop called Hamilton's established by Alva Hamilton in the 1870s. A post office operated at Buck Meadows from 1915 to 1925.

Geography

Climate
According to the Köppen Climate Classification system, Buck Meadows has a warm-summer Mediterranean climate, abbreviated "Csa" on climate maps.

Demographics

The 2010 United States Census reported that Buck Meadows had a population of 31. The population density was 17.8 people per square mile (6.9/km2). The racial makeup of Buck Meadows was 23 (74.2%) White, 0 (0.0%) African American, 0 (0.0%) Native American, 0 (0.0%) Asian, 0 (0.0%) Pacific Islander, 5 (16.1%) from other races, and 3 (9.7%) from two or more races.  Hispanic or Latino of any race were 7 persons (22.6%).

The Census reported that 31 people (100% of the population) lived in households, 0 (0%) lived in non-institutionalized group quarters, and 0 (0%) were institutionalized.

There were 15 households, out of which 2 (13.3%) had children under the age of 18 living in them, 6 (40.0%) were opposite-sex married couples living together, 0 (0%) had a female householder with no husband present, 1 (6.7%) had a male householder with no wife present.  There were 0 (0%) unmarried opposite-sex partnerships, and 0 (0%) same-sex married couples or partnerships. 8 households (53.3%) were made up of individuals, and 4 (26.7%) had someone living alone who was 65 years of age or older. The average household size was 2.07.  There were 7 families (46.7% of all households); the average family size was 3.29.

The population was spread out, with 7 people (22.6%) under the age of 18, 0 people (0%) aged 18 to 24, 9 people (29.0%) aged 25 to 44, 8 people (25.8%) aged 45 to 64, and 7 people (22.6%) who were 65 years of age or older.  The median age was 44.5 years. For every 100 females, there were 210.0 males.  For every 100 females age 18 and over, there were 200.0 males.

There were 37 housing units at an average density of 21.2 per square mile (8.2/km2), of which 4 (26.7%) were owner-occupied, and 11 (73.3%) were occupied by renters. The homeowner vacancy rate was 0%; the rental vacancy rate was 63.3%.  5 people (16.1% of the population) lived in owner-occupied housing units and 26 people (83.9%) lived in rental housing units.

Politics
In the state legislature Buck Meadows is located in the 14th Senate District, represented by Republican Tom Berryhill, and in the 25th Assembly District, represented by Republican Kristin Olsen.

See also
 Pine Mountain Lake, California

References

Sources
 Map: "Jawbone Ridge, California," 7.5-minute quadrangle, U.S. Geological Survey.
 Map: "Stanislaus National Forest, California," U.S. Forest Service, 1979.
 U.S. Bureau of the Census

Census-designated places in Mariposa County, California
Populated places in the Sierra Nevada (United States)